Keramat Ali Talukdar is a Bangladesh Nationalist Party politician and the former Member of Parliament of Mymensingh-5.

Career
Talukdar was elected to parliament from Mymensingh-5 as a Bangladesh Nationalist Party candidate in 1991.

References

Bangladesh Nationalist Party politicians
5th Jatiya Sangsad members
Year of birth missing
Year of death unknown